The Family Law Act came into force in the Canadian province of Alberta on October 1, 2005. It replaced the Domestic Relations Act, the Maintenance Order Act, the Parentage and Maintenance Act, and parts of the Provincial Court Act and the Child, Youth and Family Enhancement Act in that province.

Provincial vs national
While the federal Divorce Act governs issues arising on divorce in the province of Alberta, matrimonial proceedings other than divorce are governed by the Family Law Act which owes its origins to a major research project that was undertaken by the Alberta Law Reform Institute.

See also
Family Law Act (Ontario)

References

External links
Alberta Courts Web Site
Full text of the Family Law Act (CanLII)
 (Alberta Justice and Solicitor General)

Family law in Canada
Alberta provincial legislation
2005 in Canadian law